The Barrage de Corscia is a dam in the Haute-Corse department of France on the Golo river.
It impounds an intermediate reservoir in the Golo hydroelectric complex.
The Corscia hydroelectric power station fed by water channeled from Lac de Calacuccia has a capacity of 13 mW and discharges into the Corscia reservoir.
Downstream from the Corscia reservoir there is another power station at Castirla.

Location

The dam impounds the Golo river in the commune of Corscia to the south of the village of Corscia.
It is upstream from the Scala di Santa Regina gorge.
The D84 road runs along the north shore of the reservoir, which is elongated in a northeast direction.

Dam

The dam is owned and operated by Électricité de France (EDF).
It is a concrete arch-gravity dam.
Construction began in 1966 and was completed in 1967.
It was put into service in 1968.

Hydroelectric system

The dam is part of the Golo hydroelectric system, which also includes the Lac de Calacuccia and the Sovenzia, Corscia and Castirla hydroelectric plants.
The Sega dam on the Tavignano at an altitude of  feeds a conduit that carries  of water to the Sovenzia plant, which discharges into the Calacuccia reservoir.
This is the main water storage facility, capturing water during snow melt or rainy periods and releasing it during dry periods.

Water is taken from a point just east of the Barrage de Calacuccia and fed through a conduit to the Usine Hydroéléctrique de de Corscia.
This hydroelectric power plant is at the south end of the Corscia reservoir.
It has one generator with a capacity of 13 mW.
Further downstream there is another plant at Castirla.
A power line carries the electricity from the Sovenzia, Corscia and Castirla plants down the river valley, then north and northwest to L'Île-Rousse.

Notes

Sources

Reservoirs of Haute-Corse